is a railway station on the Hakodate Main Line in Rankoshi, Hokkaido, Japan, operated by the Hokkaido Railway Company (JR Hokkaido). It is numbered "S27".

Lines
Besides local trains, the Rapid Niseko Liner for  begins its run from the station.

Station layout
The station consists of two opposed side platforms serving two tracks. It is operated by Rankoshi municipal authority. Ordinary tickets, express tickets, and reserved-seat tickets for all JR lines are on sale.

Platforms

Adjacent stations

History
After the Hokkaido Railway was nationalized on 1 July 1907, Japanese Government Railways (JGR) took over control of the station. On 12 October 1909 the station became part of the Hakodate Main Line. On 1 April 1987, with the privatization of Japanese National Railways (JNR), the successor of JGR, the station came under the control of JR Hokkaido. From 1 October 2007, station numbering was introduced on JR Hokkaido lines, with Rankoshi Station becoming "S27".

Surrounding area
 National Route 5
 Rankoshi town office
 Rankoshi post office

See also
 List of railway stations in Japan

References

Railway stations in Hokkaido Prefecture
Stations of Hokkaido Railway Company
Railway stations in Japan opened in 1904
Rankoshi, Hokkaido